Green Eggs & Sham is a live album by punk rock band Sham 69, released in 1999 (see 1999 in music). The album title itself is a parody of Green Eggs & Ham by Dr. Seuss.

Track listing 
"Rip Off" - 1:22
"Ulster" - 2:54
"Borstal Breakout" - 2:13
"Angels with Dirty Faces" - 2:32
"Tell Us The Truth" - 2:46
"Day Tripper" - 3:28 (John Lennon, Paul McCartney)
"Questions and Answers - 3:28
"If the Kids Are United" - 3:31
"What Have We Got" - 1:30
"Red London" - 2:26
"That's Life" - 2:23
"Everybody's Innocent" - 2:00
"Hersham Boys" - 3:11
"Joey's on the Street" - 2:52

References

Sham 69 live albums
1999 live albums